Sandra Truccolo (born 25 September 1964) is an Italian paralympic archer and all round athlete. She has represented Italy as an Archer at the 1996 Summer Paralympics. She competed at the Archery at the 2000 Summer Paralympics. She was also in the Women's archery team at the 2004 Paralympics.

Truccolo married the Italian sprint canoeist Daniele Scarpa in 2007 and they offer canoeing courses.

References

External links
 

1964 births
Living people
Italian female archers
Paralympic archers of Italy
Paralympic gold medalists for Italy
Paralympic silver medalists for Italy
Paralympic bronze medalists for Italy
Paralympic medalists in archery
Archers at the 1996 Summer Paralympics
Archers at the 2000 Summer Paralympics
Archers at the 2004 Summer Paralympics
Medalists at the 1996 Summer Paralympics
Medalists at the 2000 Summer Paralympics
Medalists at the 2004 Summer Paralympics
21st-century Italian women